Pachydactylus is a genus of insectivorous geckos, lizards in the family Gekkonidae. The genus is endemic to Africa, and member species are commonly known as thick-toed geckos. The genus also displays rich speciation, having 57 distinct species identified when compared to other closely related gecko genera like Rhoptropus, most of which have emerged since 35Ma. It has been suggested that the reason for this rich speciation not from adaptive radiation nor nonadaptive radiation, but that the genus represents a clade somewhere between the two drivers of speciation. P. bibronii geckos have been used by NASA as animal models for experimentation.

Description
The genus Pachydactylus is characterized by dilated toe tips, usually with undivided scansors. Body scales are small, granular and non-overlapping, with scattered, large keeled tubercles.

Coloration of Pachydactylus species varies, but is generally drab in color.

Presence of adhesive toe pads varies by species and habitat, with rock dwelling species of Pachydactylus retaining adhesive pads, but unambiguous independent loss of toe pads in sand dwelling and burrowing species like P. rangei.

Body size in Pachydactylus varies across the 57 species, ranging from 35 to 115mm Snout-Vent Length (SVL) with the ancestral condition of a larger body size with adhesive toe pads to suit a generalist habitat.

Behavior
All observed species of Pachydactylus are strictly nocturnal.

Habitat
Pachydactylus species live in a diverse range of habitats across Southern Africa. Habitat varies by species, with some species preferring generalist habitats, human dwellings, rock-dwellings, and sand dwellings. Habitat preference typically varies by body size and retention of toe pads, which varies across the genus. The body size of Pachydactylus geckos has been shown to correlate with their habitat range.

Diet
Lizards of the genus Pachydactylus feed mainly on arthropods, but have been observed eating small vertebrates.

Geographic range
The geographic range of the genus Pachydactylus is centered on Southern Africa, with some species reaching East Africa, the northernmost limit of their distribution. In South Africa's rugged Richtersveld region, Pachydactylus geckos comprised 13 of 18 all gecko species surveyed.

Species
There are 57 species that are recognized as being valid:
Pachydactylus acuminatus 
Pachydactylus affinis  – Transvaal thick-toed gecko
Pachydactylus amoenus 
Pachydactylus angolensis  - Angola large-scaled gecko, Angolan thick-toed gecko
Pachydactylus atorquatus 
Pachydactylus austeni  – Austen's thick-toed gecko 
Pachydactylus barnardi  – Barnard's thick-toed gecko  
Pachydactylus bicolor  – velvety thick-toed gecko 
Pachydactylus boehmei 
Pachydactylus capensis  – Cape thick-toed gecko 
Pachydactylus caraculicus  – Angola banded thick-toed gecko
Pachydactylus carinatus 
Pachydactylus etultra  
Pachydactylus fasciatus  – banded thick-toed gecko
Pachydactylus formosus  – Smith's thick-toed gecko 
Pachydactylus gaiasensis  – Brandberg thick-toed gecko 
Pachydactylus geitje  – ocellated thick-toed gecko
Pachydactylus griffini 
Pachydactylus haackei  – Haacke's thick-toed gecko
Pachydactylus katanganus  
Pachydactylus kladaroderma  – thin-skinned thick-toed gecko 
Pachydactylus kobosensis 
Pachydactylus kochii 
Pachydactylus labialis  – Calvinia thick-toed gecko  
Pachydactylus latirostris  – quartz gecko 
Pachydactylus macrolepis  – large-scaled banded gecko
Pachydactylus maculatus  – spotted thick-toed gecko
Pachydactylus maraisi  
Pachydactylus mariquensis  – Marico thick-toed gecko
Pachydactylus mclachlani 
Pachydactylus monicae 
Pachydactylus montanus 
Pachydactylus namaquensis  – Namaqua thick-toed gecko 
Pachydactylus oculatus  – golden spotted thick-toed gecko 
Pachydactylus oreophilus  – Kaokoveld thick-toed gecko 
Pachydactylus oshaughnessyi  
Pachydactylus otaviensis  
Pachydactylus parascutatus  
Pachydactylus punctatus  – speckled thick-toed gecko
Pachydactylus purcelli 
Pachydactylus rangei  – Namib sand gecko
Pachydactylus reconditus 
Pachydactylus robertsi 
Pachydactylus rugosus  – rough thick-toed gecko 
Pachydactylus sansteynae  – San Steyn's thick-toed gecko 
Pachydactylus scherzi  – Sherz's thick-toed gecko 
Pachydactylus scutatus  – large-scaled thick-toed gecko 
Pachydactylus serval  – western spotted thick-toed gecko 
Pachydactylus tigrinus  – tiger thick-toed gecko 
Pachydactylus tsodiloensis  – Tsodilo thick-toed gecko 
Pachydactylus vansoni  – Van Son's thick-toed gecko
Pachydactylus vanzyli 
Pachydactylus visseri 
Pachydactylus wahlbergii 
Pachydactylus waterbergensis  
Pachydactylus weberi  – Weber's thick-toed gecko
Pachydactylus werneri 

Nota bene: A binomial authority in parentheses indicates that the species was originally described in a genus other than Pachydactylus.

References

Further reading

External links 

 
Geckos of Africa
Lizard genera
Taxa named by Arend Friedrich August Wiegmann